The Congressional Maker Caucus is a  bi-partisan group of members of the United States Congress. By working to support and advocate for the community of makers who use technologies such as 3-D printers, CNC machines, laser cutting machines and other manufacturing technologies, thus enabling anyonefrom individuals to small and large companiescreate new products.

The caucus is currently co-chaired by U.S. Representatives Mark Takano (D-CA), Steve Stivers (R-OH), Tim Ryan (D-OH), Susan Brooks (R-IN).

House members
The Congressional Maker Caucus currently has 24 members.

Arizona
David Schweikert (AZ-6)

California
Tony Cardenas (CA-29)
Jeff Denham (CA-10)
Jared Huffman (CA-2)
Doris Matsui (CA-6)
Jackie Speier (CA-14) Retiring at end of 117th Congress.
Mark Takano (CA-41)- co-chair

Florida
Debbie Wasserman Schultz (FL-23)

Illinois
Bill Foster (IL-11)

Indiana
André Carson (IN-7)

Massachusetts
Jim McGovern (MA-2)

Michigan
Debbie Dingell (MI-12)

Nevada
Dina Titus (NV-1)

New York
Paul Tonko (NY-20)
Nydia Velasquez (NY-7)

Ohio
Steve Chabot (OH-1)
David Joyce (OH-14)
Marcy Kaptur (OH-9)
Tim Ryan (OH-13)- co-chair Retiring at end of 117th Congress.

Oregon
Suzanne Bonamici (OR-1)

Pennsylvania
Matt Cartwright (PA-17)

Rhode Island
David Cicilline (RI-1)

Tennessee
Jim Cooper (TN-5) Retiring at end of 117th Congress.

Texas
Eddie Bernice Johnson (TX-30) Retiring at end of 117th Congress.

References

Caucuses of the United States Congress